Wen Wu (born 23 May 1978) is a portrait painter from Qingdao, China, residing in London.

Wu studied art at Tsinghua University. She moved to London in 2004 to complete an MA at Guildhall School of Fine Art (now part of London Metropolitan University).

Her painting Venus as a Boy was exhibited at the National Portrait Gallery in 2011 and received the BP Portrait Award for 2011. She had a solo exhibition with Riflemaker Gallery in 2017.

References

BP Portrait Award winners
Chinese portrait painters
1978 births
Living people
Painters from Shandong
20th-century Chinese painters
21st-century Chinese painters
Tsinghua University alumni